Greased Lightning is a 1977 American biographical film starring Richard Pryor, Beau Bridges, and Pam Grier, and directed by Michael Schultz. The film is loosely based on the true life story of Wendell Scott, the first Black NASCAR race winner and, later, a 2015 NASCAR Hall of Fame inductee.

Plot
In 1930s Danville, Virginia, an African-American boy named Wendell Scott impresses a group of White boys with his bike-riding powers. Fifteen years later, Wendell returns to Danville after serving in the Army during World War II. His family welcomes him home with a party and he takes an immediate liking to a guest, Mary Jones. Later, Wendell tells his mother he does not want to work in the cotton mill and plans to use his muster pay to buy a taxicab, eventually open a garage, and be his own boss. As Wendell and Mary begin dating, Wendell tells Mary's family that his real dream is be a champion racecar driver, but they do not take him seriously. Sometime later, Wendell takes Mary to an old racetrack in his new taxicab to propose, and they make love. Soon after, they are married and move into a house, but Wendell struggles to make money. One day, he sees a bootlegger named Slack and asks for a job. On his first night, he discovers his best friend, Peewee, is already working for Slack and they narrowly evade Sheriff Cotton and his men. Although Wendell is thrilled to drive fast for a living, Mary is not happy with Wendell's new profession. He insists that he tried to make money legally and this is the only way he can buy the garage. Five years later, Sheriff Cotton has still been unable to apprehend Wendell, but he captures Slack in a raid. On Easter Sunday, Wendell takes over one of Slack's runs, but soon realizes it is a set-up when he is arrested.

Billy Joe Byrnes, the local automobile racetrack owner, makes Cotton and Wendell a proposition: if Wendell agrees to race at Byrnes' track, twelve of the fifteen charges against him will be dropped, and he will receive probation. All Wendell needs to do is cross the finish line. Byrnes promotes Wendell as the first black stock car driver and on race day, there is a large multiracial crowd. During the contest, the white drivers run Wendell off the track, but he manages to complete the race and secure his freedom. Having discovered his calling, Wendell fixes up his car. At the junkyard, he meets a man named Woodrow, who volunteers to be his mechanic. Mary does not want Wendell to continue racing, but he insists on following his dream. Barred from racing at most tracks, Wendell finally gets a chance, finishes fourth, and is awarded two steak dinners at a "whites-only" restaurant. A white driver named Hutch accompanies him and they become friends. At the next race, Hutch's car will no longer run and he is forced to give up, so he joins Wendell's team as a mechanic. A few years later, in 1955, Wendell faces off with rival Beau Welles at Middle Virginia Speedway. Wendell wins a close race, but Welles is declared the winner. After the crowd has gone, the race officials admit there was an error, but Wendell is enraged because he is denied the trophy and recognition. He encourages Hutch join a bigger team so he can better provide for his family.

As years pass, Wendell joins the Grand National circuit, the highest level of the National Association for Stock Car Auto Racing (NASCAR), competing at tracks in Atlanta, Georgia; Darlington, South Carolina; Riverside, California; Phoenix, Arizona; Talladega, Alabama; and Daytona, Florida. By 1965, Wendell is a local celebrity, and Sheriff Cotton visits the Scott home. Cotton is running for Mayor of Danville and he wants a picture with Wendell and the family as a de facto endorsement. Sometime later, Wendell has a serious crash during a Talladega race and is hospitalized. Mary begs her now forty-two-year-old husband to retire, but he is adamant about racing. Later, Wendell enters an important race, and recruits Woodrow, Peewee, and his family and friends, to help him. Wendell goes to the garage of Beau Welles, hoping to buy a used engine and finds Hutch working there. Inspired by Wendell's determination, Hutch quits to rejoin Wendell's team. Back in Danville, Cotton, now mayor, works to secure Wendell sponsors so he can compete with major teams.

On the day of the big race, Wendell worries that Mary will not come, but she arrives just before it starts. During the race, Wendell makes a pit stop, but rushes his crew and pulls away with three lug nuts missing from one tire. For the remaining twenty laps, Wendell attempts to make up time on the leader, Beau Welles, as his tire wobbles precariously. As Wendell passes Welles with one lap to go he earns his first NASCAR victory and his family and friends surround him in celebration.

Cast
 Richard Pryor as Wendell Scott
 Beau Bridges as Hutch
 Pam Grier as Mary Jones
 Cleavon Little as Peewee
 Vincent Gardenia as Sheriff Cotton
 Richie Havens as Woodrow
 Julian Bond as Russell
 Earl Hindman as Beau Welles
 Lucy Saroyan as Hutch's Wife
 Noble Willingham as Billy Joe Byrnes
 Bruce Atkins as Deputy Turner
 Steve Fifield as Deputy Drinkwater
 Bill Cobbs as Mr. Jones
 Georgia Allen as Mrs. Jones

Production
Greased Lightning was partially filmed in Winder, Georgia, Athens, Georgia at the former Athens Speedway, and Madison, Georgia, as well as Middle Georgia Raceway in Byron, Georgia. Richie Havens provided the soundtrack.

Reception
Frederick I. Douglass of the Baltimore Afro American gave the picture a good review, saying Pryor and Grier demonstrated "considerable abilities" in their performances.

See also
 Stock car racing

References

External links

 
 
 
 
 

1977 films
1970s biographical drama films
African-American biographical dramas
American auto racing films
Biographical films about sportspeople
Films directed by Michael Schultz
Films scored by Fred Karlin
Films set in the 1930s
Films set in 1955
Films set in 1965
Films set in Virginia
Sports films based on actual events
Stock car racing
Warner Bros. films
Films shot in Georgia (U.S. state)
Cultural depictions of racing drivers
Cultural depictions of American men
Black people in art
American docudrama films
1977 drama films
1970s English-language films
1970s American films